Peter Angerer (born 14 July 1959) is a former West German biathlete.

Career
At the 1984 Winter Olympic Games in Sarajevo he won the gold medal in the 20 km individual. In addition he won silver in the 10 km sprint and bronze with the West German relay team. Previously at the 1980 Winter Olympic Games in Lake Placid he won a relay bronze medal and at the 1988 Winter Olympic Games in Calgary the relay team won silver. In addition to winning five World Championship medals and 24 individual World Cup races, Angerer won the overall World Cup in 1983.

Angerer won twice at the Holmenkollen ski festival biathlon competition with wins in the 20 km individual in 1984 and 1985.

At the 1986 World Championships, Angerer finished second in the individual and came third with the relay team.  Subsequently, Angerer tested positive for a doping offence that turned out to be the result of a flu remedy.

Angerer retired as an athlete after the 1987–88 season.

Today, Angerer runs a skiing school in Ruhpolding.

Biathlon results
All results are sourced from the International Biathlon Union.

Olympic Games
5 medals (1 gold, 2 silver, 2 bronze)

World Championships
5 medals (2 silver, 3 bronze)

*During Olympic seasons competitions are only held for those events not included in the Olympic program.

Individual victories
11 victories (8 In, 3 Sp)

*Results are from UIPMB and IBU races which include the Biathlon World Cup, Biathlon World Championships and the Winter Olympic Games.

References

External links
 
 Olympic biographies starting with "An"

1959 births
Living people
People from Traunstein (district)
Sportspeople from Upper Bavaria
German male biathletes
Biathletes at the 1980 Winter Olympics
Biathletes at the 1984 Winter Olympics
Biathletes at the 1988 Winter Olympics
Olympic biathletes of West Germany
Medalists at the 1980 Winter Olympics
Medalists at the 1984 Winter Olympics
Medalists at the 1988 Winter Olympics
Olympic medalists in biathlon
Olympic bronze medalists for West Germany
Olympic silver medalists for West Germany
Olympic gold medalists for West Germany
Biathlon World Championships medalists
Holmenkollen Ski Festival winners
Doping cases in biathlon
German sportspeople in doping cases